Lorri may refer to:

Acronym

 LORRI, the Long Range Reconnaissance Imager, a camera on board the New Horizons spacecraft

Given name

 Lorri Bagley, an American actress and model
 Lorri Jean, a leader in the gay, lesbian, bisexual and transgender ("GLBT") civil rights movement in America

See also
 Lory (disambiguation)
 Lorry (disambiguation)
 Lori (disambiguation)